Keith Leslie Bain (born October 24, 1952) is a Canadian politician. He represented the electoral district of Victoria-The Lakes in the Nova Scotia House of Assembly from 2006 to 2013 as a member of the Progressive Conservatives.

Bain first ran for provincial politics in the 2003 election, but was defeated by Liberal Gerald Sampson. Bain was elected in the 2006 provincial election, defeating Sampson by over 700 votes. He was re-elected in the 2009 election.  He was defeated by Liberal Pam Eyking when he ran for re-election in 2013. In May 2016, Bain was again nominated as the riding's Progressive Conservative candidate for the 2017 Nova Scotia general election. He won on election night in a re-match with Eyking.

On September 24, 2021, Bain was elected as Speaker of the Nova Scotia House of Assembly.

References

External links
 Members of the Nova Scotia Legislative Assembly

1952 births
Living people
Progressive Conservative Association of Nova Scotia MLAs
People from Victoria County, Nova Scotia
21st-century Canadian politicians